"Got No Fans" is a song by British Internet celebrity The Wealdstone Raider (real name Gordon Hill). The song stems from a YouTube video of Hill taunting opposition fans at a Whitehawk F.C. v. Wealdstone F.C. association football match in March 2013.

Released as a charity single on 14 December 2014, "Got No Fans" entered the 2014 race for Christmas number one in the United Kingdom and charted at No. 5 in the UK Singles Chart on 22 December 2014, with Ben Haenow, Mark Ronson feat. Bruno Mars, Olly Murs feat. Demi Lovato, and Ed Sheeran being the only artists to chart higher.

Chart performance

External links 
 Full Lyrics at MusixMatch.com

References 

2014 singles